Pavlovskaya is a rural locality (a village) in Kichmegnskoye Rural Settlement, Kichmengsko-Gorodetsky District, Vologda Oblast, Russia. The population was 12 as of 2002.

Geography 
Pavlovskaya is located 35 km northeast of Kichmengsky Gorodok (the district's administrative centre) by road. Maximovshchina is the nearest rural locality.

References 

Rural localities in Kichmengsko-Gorodetsky District